OPM may refer to:

Organizations
 Office of Production Management, United States government agency that existed before the U.S. entry into World War II
 United States Office of Personnel Management, the manager of the federal civil service in the United States
 Oklahoma Office of Personnel Management, the state equivalent of the federal agency
 Free Papua Movement (Organisasi Papua Merdeka), a separatist movement in Indonesia
 Political Military Organization (Organización Político Militar), Paraguayan clandestine movement

Science and technology
 Object Process Methodology
 Optical performance monitoring, used for managing high capacity optical transmission and switching systems
 Orientations of Proteins in Membranes database
 Opportunistic Mesh, a wireless networking technology
 Yamaha YM2151, an FM sound chip used in the late 1980s, also known as OPM (FM Operator Type-M)

Entertainment

 Official U.S. PlayStation Magazine, a former US gaming magazine
 PlayStation Official Magazine – UK, a British gaming magazine

Music
 OPM (band), an American band, who formed in 1999 from Los Angeles
 OPM (album), a 2008 album by Sarah Geronimo
 Original Pilipino Music, a genre of contemporary Philippine music

Other uses
 Organizational Project Management
 Online program manager, an online platform for teaching, learning and educational course management
 Outsourced program management or Outsourced program manager, see Affiliate marketing
 Owner President Management Program, see Harvard Business School#Owner/President Management Program (OPM)

See also
 Other people's money (disambiguation)